Carlos Restrepo may refer to:

 Carlos Lleras Restrepo (1908–1994), President of Colombia
 Carlos Eugenio Restrepo (1867–1937), Colombian lawyer, writer and President of Colombia
 Carlos Restrepo (manager) (born 1961), football coach